Loose Shoes and Tight Pussy is the last studio album by American pop-rock musician Alex Chilton, released in Europe in 1999. It was released in the United States in 2000 under the title Set. It was subsequently released on a double CD with one of Chilton's previous albums, Clichés.

The album is made up of cover versions of older songs, some of which have been recorded by several other artists.

Title
The title of the album comes from a racist joke that was made infamous in 1976 by politician Earl Butz, who served as Secretary of Agriculture under Presidents Richard Nixon and Gerald Ford. The quote of Butz using the racist joke in reference to African Americans, reported in Rolling Stone in an article by White House counsel John Dean, caused a controversy which ultimately led to Butz's resignation from the Ford Administration. Butz was speaking privately to entertainers Sonny Bono and Pat Boone, and to Dean, and was asked by Boone why the Republican Party had trouble attracting African-American voters when it was the party of Abraham Lincoln. As Time later reported, "The Secretary responded with a line so obscene and insulting to blacks that it forced him out of the Cabinet last week and jolted the whole Ford campaign. Butz said: 'I'll tell you what the coloreds want. It's three things: first, a tight pussy; second, loose shoes; and third, a warm place to shit.'"

Track listing
"I've Never Found a Girl" (Booker T. Jones, Eddie Floyd, Alvertis Isbell) – 3:45
"Lipstick Traces" (Naomi Neville) – 3:27
"Hook Me Up" (Johnny "Guitar" Watson) – 4:16
"The Oogum Boogum Song" (Alfred J. Smith) – 3:26
"If You's a Viper" (Leroy Smith) – 2:16
"I Remember Mama" (Shirley Caesar, Michael Mathis, Bernard Sterling, Dottie Sterling, Ann Price, Mae Newton) – 3:46
"April in Paris" (E. Y. Harburg, Vernon Duke) – 3:29
"There Will Never Be Another You" (Mack Gordon, Harry Warren) – 2:18
"Single Again" (Gary Stewart) – 2:55
"You've Got a Booger Bear Under There" (Ollie Hoskins, Quinn Golden) – 4:39
"Shiny Stockings" (Frank Foster) – 4:03
"Goodnight My Love" (John Marascalco, George Motola) – 2:55

Personnel
Alex Chilton – guitar, vocals
Ron Easley – bass guitar, backing vocals
Richard Dworkin – drums
Recorded at Sear Sound, New York City
Engineered by Tom Schick
Assisted by Todd Parker
Mixed at Ardent Studios, Memphis, Tennessee in June 1999
Mélange auteur – Don Bell
Mix and overdub engineer – Pete Matthews
Sleeve design by Louis Sutter
Photography by Vincent Lignier

References

Alex Chilton albums
1999 albums
Covers albums
Bar/None Records albums